Angeliki Gerolymou (born 22 June 1982) is a retired Greek water polo player, World Champion in 2011 in Shanghai with Greece women's national water polo team. She is the current assistant coach of Greece women's national water polo team under coach Athanasios Kechagias.

She was part of the Greek squad that competed in the 2008 Olympic Games in Beijing (8th place).

At the 2010 Women's European Water Polo Championship in Zagreb Croatia, she was part of the Greek team that won the silver medal.

At the water polo championship at the 2011 World Aquatics championships in Shanghai, China she was part of the Greek team that won the gold medal (World Champions).

At the 2012 Women's European Water Polo Championship in Eindhoven Netherlands, she won the silver medal with the Greek team.

See also
 List of world champions in women's water polo
 List of World Aquatics Championships medalists in water polo

References

External links
 

1982 births
Living people
Greek female water polo players
Olympic water polo players of Greece
Water polo players at the 2008 Summer Olympics
World Aquatics Championships medalists in water polo
Water polo players from Patras
21st-century Greek women